Valdegutur is a village in the municipality of Cervera del Río Alhama, in the province and autonomous community of La Rioja, Spain. In 2018, it had a population of 10.

References

Populated places in La Rioja (Spain)